Baruten is a local government area in the North Central district of Kwara State, Nigeria, sharing a long border with the Republic of Benin. The local government begins in Ilesha Baruba and ends in Chikanda, the border town. Its headquarters is in the town of Kosubosu.

The main language of Baruten is Baruba. Chikanda, the border town, is known for oil importation and exportation.

Its postal code is 242.

The area includes part of the Borgu Game Reserve.

References

Local Government Areas in Kwara State